Arthur Agwuncha Nwankwo  was a Nigerian author, pro-democracy activist, chancellor of EMU, and former vice-chairman of the National Democratic Coalition. As Chancellor of the Eastern Mandate Union (EMU), Nwankwo championed a return to democratic governance during a military interlude in governance under General Sani Abacha. He was detained on June 3, 1998 and was released upon the sudden death of Abacha in the same month. In 2003, he unsuccessfully ran for president under the banner of the independent People's Mandate Party, a group created out of EMU.

Life 
Nwankwo was born in Ajalli, Anambra State. He completed his collegiate degree from Eastern Mennonite University in 1966 and then continued further studies at Duquesne University where he obtained a master's degree. Upon completion of his graduate degree, he briefly worked for Gulf Oil as a consultant. At the onset of the Civil War , he returned to Nigeria where he joined the staff of the propaganda office of Biafra where he also edited a weekly newsletter.

Career 
In the early 1970s, Nwankwo began to gain some recognition  within the literary community as part of a young group of post-Civil War writers from Southeastern Nigeria who wrote about their experience during the War. Prior to the end of the Nigerian Civil War, he co-authored a book, Biafra: The Making of a Nation', documenting the role of Igbo's in Nigeria. Nwankwo also wrote Nigeria: The Challenge of Biafra.  He started a career in publishing after the war ended when he co-founded, Nwamife Publishers with Samuel Ifejika, his co-author of Biafra" The Making of a Nation and enjoying the support and patronage of writers such as Flora Nwapa and Chinua Achebe. Nwamife published its first book in 1971, a compilation of stories written by various Igbo writers.

In 1977, he co-founded Fourth Dimension Publishing Company with his brother publishing books such as Nigeria: 'The Stolen Billions'.

From publishing, Nwankwo dived into the political ring in 1979, when he ran unsuccessfully as the governorship candidate of the People's Redemption Party in Anambra State. He later became a critic of the Jim Nwobodo's administration authoring two publications where he accused Nwobodo of maladministration.

Prior to the Third Republic, Nwankwo initiated a public discourse with the publication of Cimilicy, a new form of government for Nigeria : its socialist implications. Cimilicy, a portmanteau of civilian, military and democracy is about a system of government that would ensure social and economic growth and cohesiveness in the public sphere. Ideas within the thesis include formal acceptance and incorporation of positive social developments policies that had been cultivated by civilian politicians such as mass mobilization into the  military and the incorporation of action orientated virtues of previous military rulers into civilian life to reach a balance that ensures stability in the public sphere. Nwankwo's participation in the Third Republic was minimal

Nwankwo became chancellor of the Eastern Mandate Union in 1994 and led the organization to agitate for a return to democracy after the coup of General Sani Abacha. His activities during this period caught the attention of the government who detained him. In 1997, he led the EMU to partner with NADECO becoming its vice-chairman.

He died on 1st February 2020.

References 

20th-century Nigerian historians
People from Anambra State
National Democratic Coalition (Nigeria) politicians
Eastern Mennonite University faculty